Maynard "Pat" O'Brien (January 12, 1907 – March 16, 1990) was an American football coach.  He was the 13th head football coach at Eastern Illinois State College—now known as Eastern Illinois University—in Charleston, Illinois, serving for nine seasons, from 1946 to 1950 and 1952 to 1955, and compiling a record of 27–50–1.

O'Brien Field was named in Maynard O'Brien's honor.

Head coaching record

See also
 List of college football head coaches with non-consecutive tenure

References

External links
 

1907 births
1990 deaths
Eastern Illinois Panthers football coaches